The Manipur Peoples Party (MPP) is a political party in the Indian state of Manipur. MPP was founded on 26 December 1968 by a group of dissidents from the Indian National Congress. At the February 2007 Manipur state elections, the party received 5 of the 60 seats. 

Currently it is a part of North-East Regional Political Front consisting of political parties of the northeast which has supported the National Democratic Alliance (India).

List of Chief Ministers

See also 

Indian National Congress breakaway parties
O. Joy Singh

Note

References

1968 establishments in Manipur
Indian National Congress breakaway groups
Political parties established in 1968
Political parties in Manipur
Regionalist parties in India